This is a list of flag bearers who have represented Mali at the Olympics.

Flag bearers carry the national flag of their country at the opening ceremony of the Olympic Games.

See also
Mali at the Olympics

References

Mali at the Olympics
Mali
Olympic flagbearers
Olympic flagbearers